John M. Evans, Sr., (February 12, 1820August 23, 1903) was an American physician, Republican politician, and Wisconsin pioneer.  He is the namesake of Evansville, Wisconsin, in Rock County, and was the first mayor of that city.  He also served two terms in the Wisconsin State Assembly and served as a Union Army surgeon during the American Civil War.

Biography

Born in Addison, Vermont, Evans was one of five children of Calvin R. and Penelope Evans.  When he was 13, his mother died.  His father quickly remarried and moved to La Porte, Indiana, with his new wife.  John became a ward of his maternal grandfather, Allen Goodrich, at Benson, Vermont.  He received a public school education and, in 1838, went to reside with his father in La Porte, where he had become the proprietor of a hotel.  

There, he trained as an apprentice carpenter for three years until chronic hip pain prevented him from working.  A doctor advised him to seek a new career, and, in 1842, Evans began studying at the new La Porte Medical College, run by Dr. Daniel Meeker.  In 1846, he earned his M.D. as a member of the first graduating class from the college.

Shortly after receiving his degree, Evans traveled to the Wisconsin Territory, joining a small frontier settlement in Rock County, then known as "The Grove".  This would be his primary residence for the rest of his life.  He was joined here by his father and stepmother in 1850.  In 1848, an epidemic among the population caused a great deal of work for Dr. Evans as he rushed to treat people spread across the disparate homesteads of the area.  His work won him great esteem among the residents, and, when a post office was established in the town, they named their settlement Evansville, in his honor.

From 1852 to 1855, Dr. Evans was also postmaster here.  In 1855, he was elected representative of this part of Rock County to the Wisconsin State Assembly for the 9th Wisconsin Legislature.  

At the outbreak of the American Civil War, in 1861, Dr. Evans volunteered for service and was enrolled as surgeon for the 13th Wisconsin Infantry Regiment.  Dr. Evans served with the regiment through nearly the entire war, but was forced to resign due to health problems in 1865.

Following his Civil War service, Dr. Evans returned to Evansville, where he was elected to another term in the Assembly in 1872, and, when Evansville was incorporated as a city in 1896, he was elected the first Mayor.

Dr. Evans joined the Masons while living in La Porte, in 1841, and by the end of his life was one of the most prominent Masons in the state of Wisconsin.  He was a member of several Masonic lodges throughout the southern part of the state, including the Tripoli Shrine Temple, in Milwaukee, and was grand high priest of the state in 1882 and 1883.  In addition to his masonic activities, he was an avid member of the Episcopal Church, and was active in establishing the parish at Evansville, serving as senior warden from the time of its organization until his death.

He died at his home in Evansville in August 1903, at age 83.  He continued his medical practice until just weeks before his death.

Personal life and family
On June 1, 1854, Dr. Evans married Emma Clement at La Porte, Indiana.  Together they had three children, though their second daughter, Anna Penelope, died in infancy.  Their surviving children were Elizabeth Emma, who married D. C. Griswold, and later L. E. Cary, and John M. Evans, Jr., who also became a physician and surgeon in Evansville.  Mrs. Evans preceded Dr. Evans in death, in 1899.

A significant collection of his correspondence is archived with the Evansville Wisconsin Historical Society.

Electoral history

Wisconsin Assembly (1872)

| colspan="6" style="text-align:center;background-color: #e9e9e9;"| General Election, November 4, 1872

References

External links
 

1820 births
1903 deaths
People from Addison, Vermont
People from La Porte, Indiana
People from Evansville, Wisconsin
People of Wisconsin in the American Civil War
Physicians from Wisconsin
Mayors of places in Wisconsin
Republican Party members of the Wisconsin State Assembly
19th-century American politicians